Reservation Road is a 2007 American crime drama film directed by Terry George and based on the book of the same title by John Burnham Schwartz, who, along with George, adapted the novel for the screenplay. The film, starring Joaquin Phoenix and Mark Ruffalo, deals with the aftermath of a fatal car crash. It was released to theaters on October 19, 2007.

Plot 
Dwight Arno is an attorney who is divorced from his wife Ruth. Ruth controls custody of their son Lucas while Dwight maintains visitation rights. Dwight and Lucas are at a baseball game when Ruth calls, informing Dwight that he is late returning their son home. Dwight drives Lucas home in a hurry, thinking he might otherwise forfeit his visitation privileges. When he loses control of his vehicle, he strikes a young boy, Josh Learner, who is standing by the roadside.

Aware that he has struck the boy, Dwight decides to flee the scene. He further lies to Lucas, who has a minor injury from the incident, saying that they had collided with a tree log. Dwight later hears on a newscast that Josh died in the collision. Subsequently, he tries to cover up the evidence which implicates him in the hit-and-run. After the initial shock, Josh's mother Grace gradually tries to get on with life, but her husband Ethan obsesses over finding the perpetrator. Frustrated with the lack of progress the police are making, Ethan eventually decides to hire a lawyer, who oddly enough turns out to be Dwight.

Consumed with guilt, Dwight thinks of turning himself in. At the police station he is at the point of confessing, but, being a coward, he doesn't go through with it.  The investigating officer, thinking he has come as Ethan's lawyer, admits that the case is going nowhere and leaves the room before Dwight says anything. While picking up his daughter Emma, who has begun taking piano lessons from Ruth, Ethan encounters Dwight again. In anticipation of going to jail later, Dwight asks Ruth to have Lucas for a week stating that it will be the last week for a long time. Sensing desperation, Ruth reluctantly agrees.

Later during a school performance, Ethan overhears Dwight call out to his son and begins to recognize his voice from the accident.  Ethan starts suspecting Dwight as the perpetrator and secretly investigates him; eventually discovering the truth.  Ethan fears that Dwight would be sentenced to only a short time in prison. He buys a gun and arrives at Dwight's house just as Lucas has gone to bed. Dwight begs Ethan to take him outside and spare Lucas the trauma. Ethan forces Dwight into the trunk of his car and lets him out after a short drive. Because of Ethan's emotional state and resulting hesitation, Dwight manages to grab the gun and point it at Ethan. He then points the gun at himself and convinces Ethan that he wishes he had died instead of Josh. Ethan leaves Dwight to deal with his remorse. The film ends with Lucas, by himself, watching a taped confession to the hit-and-run that Dwight had made earlier.

Cast 
 Joaquin Phoenix as Ethan Learner
 Mark Ruffalo as Dwight Arno
 Jennifer Connelly as Grace Learner
 Mira Sorvino as Ruth Wheldon
 Elle Fanning as Emma Learner
 Eddie Alderson as Lucas Arno
 Sean Curley as Josh Learner
 Antoni Corone as Sergeant Burke

Production

Filming 
The film was shot in Stamford, Connecticut, starting in late October, 2006, with the very first city scene from Annapolis, Maryland, and the next scene at Cove Island Park in Stamford. Parts of the movie were also filmed at Lake Compounce Amusement Park in Bristol, Connecticut, and the Olde Blue Bird Inn & Gas Station and adjacent Baseball Field in Easton, Connecticut. Shots of Martha's Vineyard, Massachusetts are used in the trailer and movie.

Release 
Reservation Road grossed a total of $36,269 in its first weekend. It ended up making $121,994 in the United States, and ended with a worldwide gross of $1,783,190. The film was released on DVD on April 8, 2008.

Reception 
The film received mixed reviews from critics. Metacritic gives the film an average score of 46 out of 100, based on 29 reviews. Rotten Tomatoes gives the film 38% based on reviews from 112 critics, with an average rating of 5.23/10. The website's critics consensus reads, "While the performances are fine, Reservation Road quickly adopts an excessively maudlin tone along with highly improbable plot turns."

References

External links 
 
 
 
 

2007 films
2007 crime drama films
2000s English-language films
American crime drama films
Films about child death
Films about grieving
Films about road accidents and incidents
Films based on American novels
Films directed by Terry George
Films scored by Mark Isham
Films set in Connecticut
Films shot in Connecticut
Films shot in Martha's Vineyard
Focus Features films
2000s American films